Vsevolod Serhiiovych Kniaziev (born 25 May 1979, Mykolaiv) is a Ukrainian judge, President of the Supreme Court since 1 December 2021.  He is an ex officio member of the High Council of Justice and a judge of the Grand Chamber of the Supreme Court.

Biography 
Originally from Mykolaiv. He graduated from the Mykolaiv Нumanitarian Institute of the Ukrainian State Maritime Technical University and the Odesa Law Academy National University. In 2001, he received the right to practice law, which was suspended in 2013. He worked as a legal adviser, a lecturer at the Admiral Makarov National University of Shipbuilding, and a lawyer.

Since 2013, he started working as a judge of the Mykolaiv District Administrative Court, and in 2015 he became the president of this court.

Vsevolod Kniaziev is a judge of the Cassation Administrative Court within the Supreme Court, established after the reform of 2016.

On 12 December 2017, Vsevolod Kniaziev was elected Secretary of the Grand Chamber of the Supreme Court.

On 22 October 2021, the Plenum of the Supreme Court elected a new President of this institution by secret ballot. It was Kniaziev, who was voted for by 98 colleagues. He began exercising his powers on 1 December.

Facts 
PhD in Law (2011), Associate Professor (2014), LL.D., Professor (2021). The author of a number of scientific publications. As for foreign languages, he is fluent in English, Russian and also French (basic skills).
Kniaziev's wife Yuliia is a private notary. He has a daughter Viktoriia and a son Volodymyr.

References

External links 
 Декларації
 Новий голова Верховного Суду: що каже він, що кажуть про нього // Ukrinform, 22 October 2021

1979 births
Living people
Judges of the Supreme Court of Ukraine
People from Mykolaiv
Ukrainian judges